The 1934 Trinity Hilltoppers football team represented the Trinity College during the 1934 college football season. In its third season under head coach Dan Jessee, the team compiled a perfect 7–0 record and outscored opponents by a total of 187 to 13.

Schedule

References

Trinity
Trinity Bantams football seasons
College football undefeated seasons
Trinity Hilltoppers football